John J. Boyle (January 12, 1851, New York City – February 10, 1917, New York City) was an American sculptor active in Philadelphia in the last decades of the 19th century, known for his large-scale figurative bronzes in public settings, and, particularly, his portraiture of Native Americans.

Early years & education 
Boyle, born 1851 in New York to Samuel Boyle and Katharine McCauley, moved to the state of Pennsylvania before his first birthday. After his father's death in 1857, Boyle's remaining family, in straitened circumstances, moved to Philadelphia to live with relatives. Boyle attended public schools in Philadelphia, then served an apprenticeship as a stone-cutter. In 1872 he began studying art at the PAFA, taking classes with Thomas Eakins and other faculty. He studied at the École des Beaux Arts in Paris for three years starting in 1877, returning to the United States and marrying Elizabeth Carroll, in Philadelphia, in 1882.

Career

Paris Salon 
Boyle's time in Paris established him as a successful, medaled ornament to the Salon, the official art exhibition of the Académie des Beaux-Arts in Paris (the École being the visual arts division of the Académie). Although he returned to the United States to secure commissions ~1880, he continued to show his works in Paris, joining company with the generation of Philadelphia artists who moved back and forth between Europe and the United States during this period.

By the mid to late 19th century, the Romantic Movement had begun to see expression in the United States, particularly in the artistic circle centered at Philadelphia's PAFA, moving away from the "Grand Style" of the first part of the 19th century. John Boyle, "authentic in his rude strength," was among those active in this form.

This was a period of many firsts for American artists. Boyle would become known for his portraits of Native Americans, bolstered by an 1880 two month domicile among the Sioux in the Dakotas. The Alarm, commissioned by Martin Ryerson for Lincoln Park in Chicago, was intended to commemorate local Ottawa tribes, as part of a monument which originally included four bas-relief panels entitled “ The Peace Pipe,” “The Corn Dance,” “Forestry,” and “The Hunt” on its base (these original panels were stolen in the 1960s and replaced with sand-blasted reproductions).

World's Fair Participation 

Boyle's prominence in the Philadelphia art scene by the 1890s was reflected by commissions for the Art Club of Philadelphia, including the design of their gold medal award, a prestigious form of social recognition. Along with other noted artists and architects of the 1890s, Boyle was invited to participate in the Chicago World Fair of 1893 (the Columbian Exposition).

Artistic advisor Augustus Saint-Gaudens delegated the "career-enhancing commissions for monumental sculptures that promoted the exposition's overarching theme of national identity," to a select group of sculptors it was felt would portray young America in its most promising light. He entrusted with the responsibility of supervising the sculptural decoration of the Louis Sullivan Transportation Building, work that was to include "five huge bas-reliefs, and eight triads of figures of heroic size, besides eight symbolical as well as allegorical figures," employing a staff of sculptors to complete his designs. Executed in "staff," an impermanent mixture of plaster of Paris and fibrous materials, it was not expected that these works would endure beyond the fair's closing, but the scale, not merely for Boyle's work, but for 1893 America, went well beyond projects previously achieved. "For the sculptors whose works were displayed outdoors on the fairgrounds as well as in the Fine Arts Building, the World's Columbian Exposition was a professional and aesthetic coming of age," a "full flowering" of a naturalistic Beaux-Arts aesthetic that left the static formalism of neo-classicism behind.

The success of Boyle's work in this venue cemented his reputation as a sculptor for American ideals, leading to commissions in Washington in the newly built Library of Congress building (figures of Sir Francis Bacon and Plato, bronze, 1894–96) in Washington, D.C.

Public Works 
A statue of Benjamin Franklin for the Philadelphia Post office followed (1896–99), followed by an invitation to participate in the Pan-American Exposition of 1901. He was appointed a member of the Art Commission of Greater New York January 1, 1906, and it was in New York that he and his wife spent their later years.Member of many artistic clubs (National Sculpture Society, The Architectural League of New York, the T-Square Club of Philadelphia, and the National Arts Club) he was still actively at work on a public project for the government (Commodore John Barry (1911–14), Franklin Square, Washington, D.C.), when he died from pneumonia in February 1917.

Legacy 

Boyle spent the last years of his life in New York City.  In 1910, he was elected into the National Academy of Design as an Associate member.

Boyle died at his home in New York City in 1917. Behests by his wife to the PAFA in his memory included Tired out (bronze), a Native American subject dated 1887.

Selected works
The Alarm, (Indian Alarm) (1884), Lincoln Park, Chicago, Illinois.
Stone Age in America (1887), Fairmount Park, Philadelphia, Pennsylvania.
Tammany, 42nd New York Infantry Memorial (1891), Gettysburg Battlefield, Gettysburg, Pennsylvania.
Sir Francis Bacon (1894–96), Library of Congress, Washington, D.C.
Plato (1894–96), Library of Congress, Washington, D.C.
Benjamin Franklin (1896–99), University of Pennsylvania, Philadelphia, Pennsylvania. A replica was exhibited at the 1904 Saint Louis World's Fair in Saint Louis, Missouri.
Bust of Charles Lenning (1900), University of Pennsylvania, Philadelphia, Pennsylvania.
The Savage Age in the Eastern Hemisphere (1901), Pan-American Exposition, Buffalo, New York.
The Savage Age in the Western Hemisphere (1901), Pan-American Exposition, Buffalo, New York.
Bust of James V. Brown (1907), James V. Brown Library, Williamsport, Pennsylvania.
John Christian Bullitt (1907), City Hall, Philadelphia, Pennsylvania.
Rebecca at the Well (1908), Fairmount Park, Philadelphia, Pennsylvania.
Commodore John Barry (1911–14), Franklin Square, Washington, D.C.

Gallery

References

External links

http://www.arcadja.com/auctions/en/boyle_john_j_/artist/132914/

1851 births
1917 deaths
Artists from New York City
American alumni of the École des Beaux-Arts
Pennsylvania Academy of the Fine Arts alumni
19th-century American sculptors
19th-century American male artists
American male sculptors
20th-century American sculptors
20th-century American male artists
Sculptors from New York (state)